Chris McDonald (born in 1976) is an English chemical engineer and business executive with extensive experience in setting industrial policy. Since 2014, McDonald has been CEO of the Materials Processing Institute, after leading its divestment from Tata Steel.

In 2023, he was selected as the next Labour candidate for the Stockton North constituency.

Early career
Born in County Durham in North East England, McDonald held an at British Steel, before going on to read Chemical Engineering at the University of Cambridge.  Upon graduating, he worked in various roles in the steel industry, but focused on research.

Recent career
In 2016, Chris launched the Materials Processing Institute's commercial steel-making operation from its facility on Teesside.

In 2018, McDonald appeared on BBC Radio 4 Today, to discuss the future of the British steel industry. As CEO of the Materials Processing Institute, McDonald helped secure a £3m investment from the Tees Valley Growth Deal to build the Institute's SME Technology Centre. He has also oversaw the development of a doctoral academy at the Institute, "The Millman Scholarships".

Politics 

In march 2023, McDonald was selected as Parliamentary candidate for Labour in the next election for the constituency of Stockton North, to replace Alex Cunningham, who will stand down. On being selected, he said his two main priorities were "creating opportunities for young people" and transitioning industry, particularly in Billingham, "to [a] green industry"

References

English chief executives
Living people
1977 births